Lophocampa montana is a moth of the family Erebidae. It was described by William Schaus in 1911. It is known from Poás Volcano in Costa Rica.

Description

Taxonomy
Lophocampa propinqua Edwards, 1884 has "Lophocampa montana Gaede, 1928" as a synonym.

References

Halisidota montana at Biodiversity Heritage Library

montana
Moths described in 1911